1933 ballet premieres, List of
Lists of ballet premieres by year
Lists of 1930s ballet premieres
Ball